Stefan Edberg defeated the defending champion Brad Gilbert in the final, 6–1, 6–1 to win the singles tennis title at the 1990 Cincinnati Masters.

Seeds
The top eight seeds received a bye to the second round.

  Stefan Edberg (champion)
  Andre Agassi (third round)
  Andrés Gómez (semifinals)
  Brad Gilbert (final)
  Aaron Krickstein (third round)
  Jay Berger (third round)
  Michael Chang (quarterfinals)
  John McEnroe (third round)
  Andrei Chesnokov (second round)
  Pete Sampras (third round)
  Jim Courier (quarterfinals)
  Jonas Svensson (first round)
  Guy Forget (third round)
  Tim Mayotte (first round)
  Richard Fromberg (quarterfinals)
  Petr Korda (first round)

Draw

Finals

Top half

Section 1

Section 2

Bottom half

Section 3

Section 4

References

Singles